The Oakland Athletics Radio Network consists of 15 AM stations and 7 FM translators or repeaters in the state of California, including the flagship station, KNEW (960 AM). There is a 4-station Spanish-language network (all AM) with affiliates in italics. The Spanish-language network only airs night & weekend home games.

Network stations
Spanish-language stations are in italics

Flagships

California

Former flagships
Sources:

See also
List of XM Satellite Radio channels
List of Sirius Satellite Radio stations
List of Oakland Athletics broadcasters

References

External links
List of affiliates on the Athletics' site

Oakland Athletics

Major League Baseball on the radio
Sports radio networks in the United States